Fathabad Rural District may refer to:
 Fathabad Rural District (Fars Province)
 Fathabad Rural District (Kerman Province)
 Fathabad Rural District (Kermanshah Province)
 Fathabad Rural District (Khatam County), Yazd province